Camp Shorabak (formerly Camp Bastion) is a former British Army airbase, located northwest of the city of Lashkargah in Helmand Province, Afghanistan. The camp was situated in a remote desert area, far from population centres.

The camp was built by the British Army in 2005-06, and on 27 October 2014 the British Army handed over control to the Afghan Ministry of Defense. Between 2005 and October 2014 it was the logistics hub for International Security Assistance Force (ISAF) operations in Helmand during the War in Afghanistan and Operation Herrick, and it was capable of accommodating over 32,000 people. It was the largest British overseas military camp built since the Second World War. The base was also home to troops from other states, including the United States and Denmark.

Shorabak contained the Afghan National Army (ANA) camp (also called Camp Shorabak), and also held Camp Leatherneck until 2014.

The Taliban took control of Afghanistan in July–August 2021; and the camp is now under control by the Taliban.

History

Camp Shorabak began life as Camp Bastion, a tactical landing zone set up by two air traffic controllers from the Royal Air Force's Tactical Air Traffic Control Unit.  This provided a vital and strategic insertion point in Helmand Province and unbeknownst to the two controllers, was to be the foundations for Camp Shorabak.  The camp started out with just a few tents in 2005. However, from early 2006 personnel from 39 Engineer Regiment Royal Engineers and various contracting firms, all under the supervision of 62 Works Group Royal Engineers started to build the base with more robust facilities. In November 2006, the then British Prime Minister Tony Blair visited Camp Bastion, and, while addressing a gathering of British troops, described it as an "extraordinary piece of desert ... where the fate of world security in the early 21st century is going to be decided".

Four miles long by two miles wide, the camp had a busy airfield and a field hospital and originally had full accommodation for 2,000 people.

The base was originally named by the Commanding Officer of 62 Works Group (RE) based upon name of the gabions used to form the compounds walls; Hesco Bastion. The first camp to be built was Camp 251 which housed the construction force and they were housed in tents.  The first runway capable of handling C-17s direct from the United Kingdom opened in Camp Bastion on 3 December 2007.

The base had previously been divided into a number of different sections (bastions). Bastions 1 and 2 were the first, with Bastion 2 containing Camp Barber (US) and Camp Viking (DK). Bastion 0 was added in around 2010 and housed the contractors and Bastion 3 was used for in-theatre training.

Camp Bastion included Bastion Airfield, Bastion Garrison and Camp Leatherneck along with Rowe Lines.

By September 2014 it was reported that both Bastion 2 and 3 had reverted to desert.

Camp Bastion airfield and heliport handled up to 600 fixed- and rotary-wing aircraft movements every day in 2011, operating combat, medical and logistics flights. Its air traffic controllers were integral to the support of the UK's operations in southern Afghanistan and the Air Traffic Control Squadron at Camp Bastion was the first to recruit and train US Marines to UK air traffic control standards.

In February 2014, snow fell in Camp Bastion for the first time since the base was established, eight years earlier.

The camp was handed over to the control of the Afghan security forces on 26 October 2014.

On 27 November 2014, insurgents infiltrated Camp Bastion. As of Sunday 30 November, the Afghan National Army had not fully driven out the "Taliban" fighters. At least five ANA soldiers were killed in the attack.

Upon completion of British and US military withdrawal from Camp Bastion, it was renamed Camp Shorabak as this was the name of the Afghan base situated there.

In December 2015, it was announced that a small contingency of British troops would return to Camp Shorabak in an advisory role, due to the Taliban overrun of Sangin district in Helmand province.

The base was initially home to the Afghan National Army and during Operation Herrick 7 2nd Battalion, the Yorkshire Regiment's Battlegroup HQ.

Before the 2021 Taliban takeover, home to 4th Kandak, 3rd Brigade, 205th Corps.

The ring road, watchtowers and large parts of Bastion I still remain to be maintained.

United Kingdom

Aviation

The main user of the camp was the United Kingdom which based a number of rotary and a few fixed-wing aircraft.

During June 2011 a brand new air traffic control tower was opened which was built by 170 Engineer Group, with Fixed Communications Infrastructure installed by 241 Sig Sqn, 10 Sig Regt.

The main aviation unit was No. 903 Expeditionary Air Wing which was responsible for the operation of the airfield and operated the Raytheon Sentinel R1 - Airborne Stand-Off Radar (ASTOR) along with Westland Sea King ASACs and Thales Watchkeepers.

Joint Helicopter Force (Afghanistan) operated AgustaWestland Apaches, Westland Lynx, Westland Sea Kings,  Boeing Chinooks of No. 1310 Flight RAF and AgustaWestland Merlins of No. 1419 Flight RAF.   Both RAF Flights performed troop and cargo moves but the Chinook also carried the Medical Emergency Response Team (MERT) and Incident Response Teams (IRT).

Ground based

The UK had a large number of major units based here:
 Afghanistan Media Operations Cell
 Crew Training School (for vehicles)
 EOD & Search Task Force
 Joint Force Support (Afghanistan) which included:
 Joint Force Medical Group.
 Joint Media Operations Centre.
 Joint Theatre Education Centre.
 Theatre Military Working Dogs Support Unit.
 Theatre Logistic Group.

A number of smaller units were also deployed here including:
 Base Security
No 2 Tactical Police Sqn, Royal Air Force Police
 OP H 19 - A Company - The Highlanders, 4th Battalion, Royal Regiment of Scotland
 Joint ISTAR Group (brigade surveillance and reconnaissance support)
 OP H 19 -  9th/12th Royal Lancers
 Units based at Bastion
 OP H 7 - 40 Commando Battlegroup HQ
 OP H 10/11 - 2nd Royal Tank Regiment (Egypt Squadron)
 OP H 13 - 16 Air Assault Medical Regiment - Elements of 19, 23 & 181 Medical Support Squadrons.
 OP H 19 - 4 SCOTS
 OP H 20 - 26th Regiment RA

The base was protected by the Bastion Force Protection Wing as part of the multi-national Task Force Belleau Wood.

During August 2013 the Headquarters of Task Force Helmand moved from Lashkar Gah to Bastion.

In 2013, a training school for Afghan troops was opened.

By March 2014, the population of the camp had reduced to 4,000 UK service personnel, as preparations were well-underway for UK military withdrawal from Helmand in October 2014.

During the dismantling of the base the scrap metal was taken away by ProCon Building Materials Trading LLC.

United States

The United States Military used part of Bastion Airfield for their aircraft and they had their own camp within Camp Bastion until 26 October 2014.

The last unit was the 2nd Marine Aircraft Wing (Forward) which began operating from April 2014. It consisted of:
 Marine Light Attack Helicopter Squadron 467 (HMLA-467) which operated Bell AH-1W SuperCobras and Bell UH-1Y Venoms.
 Marine Wing Support Squadron 274 (MWSS-274) from 7 April 2014.

Marine Wing Suppprt Squadron-371(February 2009-October) laid aluminum matting in Camp Bastion and throughout Helmand Province.

On 14 September 2012 Camp Bastion was attacked by a unit of 15 Taliban fighters. The base was defended by pilots and aircraft maintenance personnel from Marine Attack Squadron 21 and No. 51 Squadron RAF Regiment. Base security had been reduced in the weeks leading up to the attack, and the Taliban unit was able to damage or destroy eight USMC AV-8B Harrier II jets before all were killed or captured. Two Marines died in the fighting.

Other countries
Camp Shorabak has been used by various countries including Denmark (until 20 May 2014), Estonia (until 9 May 2014) and Tonga (until 28 April 2014).

Hospital

Camp Bastion's Hospital was built by 170 Engineer Group and was operated by regular and reserve personnel of the British Army, Royal Navy, and Royal Air Force of the Joint Force Medical Group, as well as medical assets from the US Army. Medical staff included Orthopaedic Surgeons, General Surgeons, Anaesthetists, Nurses and Medics. The hospital was the location to which wounded military personnel from the British, US and other ISAF forces in Helmand Province were evacuated from the battlefield for treatment, supported by US Army, Navy, and Air Force medics, or from which they were further evacuated to the Royal Centre for Defence Medicine at Queen Elizabeth Hospital in Birmingham. Afghan civilians were also treated at the hospital for injuries sustained in war including victims of improvised explosive device attacks. The hospital was closed down on 22 September 2014.

A number of units were deployed to Afghanistan and worked at the hospital:

 OP H 4 - 22 Field Hospital (Hospital Squadron)
 OP H 5 - Royal Navy Hospital Squadron
 OP H 6A - 212 (Yorkshire) Field Hospital
 OP H 6B - 208 (Liverpool) Field Hospital
 OP H 7A - 201 (Northern) Field Hospital
 OP H 7B - 243 (The Wessex) Field Hospital
 OP H 8A - 203 (Welsh) Field Hospital
 OP H 8B - 204 (North Irish) Field Hospital
 OP H 9 - Royal Navy Hospital Squadron
 OP H 10A - 202 (Midlands) Field Hospital
 OP H 10B - Danish Field Hospital
 OP H 11 - 33 Field Hospital
 OP H 11A - 256 Field Hospital
 OP H 11B - 205 Field Hospital

 OP H 12 - 34 Field Hospital
 OP H 13A - 207 (Manchester) Field Hospital
 OP H 13B - 212 (Yorkshire) Field Hospital
 OP H 14 - Royal Navy Hospital Squadron
 OP H 15A - 208 (Liverpool) Field Hospital
 OP H 15B - 201 (Northern) Field Hospital
 OP H 16 - 22 Field Hospital
 OP H 17A - 243 (The Wessex) Field Hospital
 OP H 17B - 204 (North Irish) Field Hospital
 OP H 18 - 33 Field Hospital
 OP H 19A - 203 (Welsh) Field Hospital
 OP H 19B - 202 (Midlands) Field Hospital
 OP H 20 - 34 Field Hospital

Accidents and incidents

The base has been attacked several times including on 14 September 2012, when two United States Marine Corps (USMC) service personnel were killed and six USMC McDonnell Douglas AV-8B Harrier IIs were destroyed and two were "significantly damaged."  Three refuelling stations were also destroyed, with six soft-skin aircraft hangars damaged. Of the 15 Taliban attackers, 14 were killed and 1 captured.

In May 2013 the BBC obtained documents showing that up to 85 Afghan nationals were being detained at Camp Shorabak. Philip Hammond, the then defence secretary, confirmed that the UK was holding "80 or 90 Afghan detainees" at the base. The Ministry of Defence maintains the detention of the Afghans is legal.

On March 1, 2019, Taliban suicide bombers and gunmen made an early morning attack on Afghan forces at Camp Shorabak, killing 23, following another round of talks between U.S. and Taliban negotiators. According to an American military spokesman, U.S. Marine advisers (who suffered no casualties) helped Afghan troops repel the attack.

Commanders
 Group Captain Tony Innes (January 2013 – 2014)
 Deputy: Wing Commander John Lyle (June 2013 – December 2013)
 Group Captain Jeff Portlock (August 2012 – January 2013)
 Group Captain Dave Waddington (unknown – August 2012) 
 Group Captain Al Gillespie
 Group Captain Scott Notman (February–September 2011)
 Deputy: Wing Commander Gordon Pell (July 2011 – January 2012)
 Group Captain Guy van den Berg (October 2010 – February 2011)
 Deputy: Wing Commander Guy Edwards (January 2011 – July 2011)
 Garrison Sergeant Major, Warrant Officer Class 1 Cox
 Group Captain John Cunningham (unknown – September 2010)
 Deputy: Wing Commander Rich Yates (unknown – January 2011)
 Colonel Angus Mathie (December 2009 – June 2010)

In media
Camp Shorabak has been featured in several documentaries, often focusing on medical evacuations.
 The Air Hospital (Channel 4) - aired 25 March 2010. 
 Frontline Medicine (BBC 2) - aired 20 and 27 November 2011.
 Extraordinary Dogs (Documentary Channel). 
 Prince Harry: Frontline Afghanistan (BBC Three) - aired 28 January 2013.
 Gary Barlow: Journey to Afghanistan (ITV) - aired 23 December 2013.
 Top Gear (BBC2) - aired 9 February 2014.
 The Billion Pound Base: Dismantling Camp Bastion (Channel 4) - aired 7 December 2014.
 The One Show - Afghanistan: Coming Home (BBC1) - Series of films on redeployment of 2RTR soldiers and equipment from Camp Bastion. Filmed in September/November 2013. Narrated by Dan Snow and Tony Livesey. - aired January 2014.
"Our Girl"(BBC 1).
"Road Warriors" (ITV) featuring 4 Logistic Support Regiment RLC

See also
 September 2012 Camp Bastion raid
 List of Afghan Armed Forces installations
 Operation Herrick
 Operation Herrick order of battle

References

Citations

Bibliography

External links

 24 September 2012 BBC News, "Inside Camp Bastion"  
Photos of Camp Bastion
Guardian report on Camp Bastion 2011
The Daily Telegraph - I've been inside Camp Bastion - and it seemed like the safest place on earth
Photographer Robert Wilson inside Camp Bastion

2006 establishments in Afghanistan
2006 in the United Kingdom
Helmand Province
Human rights in Afghanistan
Installations of the British Army
Internment camps
Military installations of Denmark
Military bases of the United Kingdom in Afghanistan
Prisons in Afghanistan
War in Afghanistan (2001–2021)
Bases
Estonia
Afghanistan